Vepris mandangoana is a species of plant in the family Rutaceae. It is endemic to the Democratic Republic of the Congo along the Congo River.  It is threatened by habitat loss.

References

mandangoana
Endemic flora of the Democratic Republic of the Congo
Vulnerable flora of Africa
Taxonomy articles created by Polbot